The British Official Armour Specification is a set of standards for armour construction for armoured fighting vehicles, including tanks, during the late Interwar Period and into World War II.

Standards list
Standards applicable to British tanks of World War II are as follows:

 I.T.60:  Face-hardened 7 to 12 mm steel plate.
 I.T.70:  Thin homogeneous hard 3 to 30 mm plate.
 I.T.80:  Thick homogeneous-machineable 15 mm and greater plate.
 I.T.90:  Cast armour of all thicknesses.
 I.T.100:  Thin homogeneous-machineable 3 to 14 mm plate.
 I.T.110:  Carbon manganese steel backing plate.

See also
 List of tanks of the United Kingdom
 List of World War II tanks

Resources 
 

Tanks of the United Kingdom
Armour Specification
Military history of the United Kingdom during World War II
Armour Specification